The Hollywood Post Alliance Award for Outstanding Visual Effects - Television (Under 13 Episodes) is an annual award, given by the Hollywood Post Alliance, or HPA, to post production workers in the film and television industry, in this case visual effects artists. It was first awarded in 2006, and outside of 2008 and 2010, has been presented every year since.  From 2006 to 2012, the category was titled Hollywood Post Alliance Award for Outstanding Compositing - Television. In 2018, the category started separating series that had more than 13 episodes a season, and those that had less than 13.

Winners and nominees
 † – indicates the winner of the Primetime Emmy Award for Outstanding Special Visual Effects
 ‡ – indicates a nominee for the Primetime Emmy Award for Outstanding Special Visual Effects
 †† – indicates the winner of the Primetime Emmy Award for Outstanding Special Visual Effects in a Supporting Role
 ‡‡ – indicates a nominee for the Primetime Emmy Award for Outstanding Special Visual Effects in a Supporting Role

2000s
Outstanding Compositing - Television

2010s

Outstanding Visual Effects - Television

Outstanding Visual Effects - Television (Under 13 Episodes)

Programs with multiple wins

6 awards
 Game of Thrones (HBO)

Programs with multiple nominations

7 nominations
 Game of Thrones (HBO)

3 nominations
 Black Sails (Starz)
 Ripper Street (Amazon)

2 nominations
 Boardwalk Empire (HBO)
 Castle (ABC)
 The Flash (The CW)
 Hawaii Five-0 (CBS)
 House (Fox)
 Westworld (HBO)

References

Arts awards in the United States